Uladzimir Leonavich Syanko (born 5 August 1946) is a former Belarusian diplomat and politician. He served as the Minister of Foreign Affairs from 1994 to 1997. From 1994 to 2004, he was an ambassador to France, Spain, and Portugal. He joined the Moscow State Institute of International Relations in 1973 and Diplomatic Academy of the Ministry of Foreign Affairs of the Russian Federation in 1987.

Personal life 
Syanko is married and has children.

References

Further reading 
 Gramota Pochwalna Rady Ministrów Republiki Białorusi (3 kwietnia 2006 roku) – za wysokie osiągnięcia w sferach wytwórczej i społeczno-kulturalnej, znaczny osobisty wkład w wykonanie prognozowanych wskaźników rozwoju społeczno-ekonomicznego republiki w latach 2001–2005
 Centrum Naukowo-Analityczne „Białoruska Perspektywa”: Kto jest kim w Białorusi. Białystok: Podlaski Instytut Wydawniczy, 2000, s. 313, seria: Biblioteka Centrum Edukacji Obywatelskiej Polska – Białoruś. .

1946 births
Belarusian diplomats
Foreign ministers of Belarus
Living people
Ambassadors of Belarus to the United Kingdom
Ambassadors of Belarus to Ireland
Ambassadors of Belarus to Belgium
Ambassadors of Belarus to France
Ambassadors of Belarus to Spain
Ambassadors of Belarus to Portugal
Ambassadors of Belarus to Poland
Ambassadors of Belarus to Denmark
Permanent Delegates of Belarus to UNESCO